The Third Reich 'n Roll is the second studio album by the American art rock group The Residents, released on Ralph Records in 1976. The album consists of two side-long suites of "'semi-phonetic' interpretations of Top 40 rock and roll from the Sixties."

The album generated some controversy due to its cover art and Nazi imagery (promotional photos featured the Residents dressed as giant swastikas and wearing oversized swastika glasses). A window display in Berkeley was met with protests and threats of violence, and the album with its original cover (featuring American Bandstand host Dick Clark dressed in a Nazi uniform clutching a carrot) is still banned in Germany. Regardless, it is considered one of the group's masterworks along with most of their material from the 1970s.

Recording 
In 1974, the Residents were considering making their follow-up to Meet the Residents as a cover album. They initially wanted their friend Snakefinger to play guitar on the album but as he was in England at the time, the group instead searched for a local guitarist, and eventually Gary Phillips of Earth Quake was suggested to them. The Residents recorded "Swastikas on Parade" in one week during October 1974. The next year, the Residents returned to the concept and recorded the second track, titled "Hitler Was a Vegetarian."

Music video 
In 1972, whilst on a break from filming Vileness Fats, the Residents produced a short film in which they danced and played in a newspaper-covered room, fully dressed in newspaper suits. Later in 1976, in order to promote their third album (the second one having been recorded in secrecy), the Residents synced this short film up with an edited version of "Swastikas on Parade", and filmed additional scenes on the set of Vileness Fats. The resulting video, entitled "The Residents play the Third Reich 'n' Roll", drew small controversy on the fact the band's newspaper suits resembled Ku Klux Klan outfits, but the Residents have insisted it is not an intentional connection. Regardless, the short film is credited as one of the first examples of music video as an art form, and is included in the permanent collection of the Museum of Modern Art in New York.

Concept 
According to the album's original liner notes, entitled "Why do the Residents hate the Beatles?" (in reference to the cover art of their previous album Meet the Residents), the Third Reich 'n' Roll is a commentary on how "rock and roll has brainwashed the youth of the world."

None of the songs are named anywhere on the album; some are obvious, while others are either unrecognizable or played simultaneously. Notable selections include "Land of a Thousand Dances", "Double Shot (of My Baby's Love)", "Papa's Got a Brand New Bag" (sung in German), "Wipe Out", "96 Tears", "Yummy Yummy Yummy", and "Hey Jude" (paired with "Sympathy for the Devil").

The Residents would later record a cover of another Rolling Stones song, "(I Can't Get No) Satisfaction", and release it as a single to promote the album. Originally a limited edition, it would be re-released in 1978 to capitalize on the group's unexpected success on the British new wave charts.

Release history
In 1980, a Third Reich 'n' Roll Collector's Box was produced in a limited edition of 30 copies, of which 25 were released. These came with a hand-pressed red-marbled vinyl edition of the record with silk-screened sleeve and labels, in a velvet-lined black wooden box with a sliding panel featuring hand-screened version of the cover art. Also enclosed were two lithographs by Irene Dogmatic, signed and numbered. The entire box was enclosed in a drawstring bag made from a piece of Christo's Running Fence.

Due to controversy regarding the album's Nazi themes, the album was banned in Germany (in which Nazi imagery is illegal). In 1981, the album was repressed for German export with a heavily censored cover.

The 1993 CD reissue by Euro Ralph included brand new cover art, featuring Adolf Hitler holding a carrot and Madonna holding a Resident eyeball head. All swastikas were eliminated from this version of the cover.

A special-edition hardcover containing all the original artwork and promotional photos was released on Mute Records in September 2005.

The album was reissued in 2018 as part of the Residents' pREServed remaster campaign, featuring contemporary singles, live performances, and a number of previously unheard outtakes. This reissue also featured a newly updated cover design, derived from the censored German version.

Reception 
In the December 31, 1977 issue of Sounds magazine, Jon Savage described the album as "Funny – and frightening." Peter Silverton described the album as the Residents' "one unqualified masterpiece," and the best party game of the Seventies. FACT magazine ranked the album #70 on their Top 100 Albums of the 1970s, calling it "the precursor for everything from the KLF to Matmos, the Church of the SubGenius to the Fall."

Legacy 
The album is considered by some to be a precursor for mashup music, and the Residents are sometimes credited with popularizing the practice of sampling in commercial music. The album also features what is thought to be the first James Brown sample on a commercially released record, borrowing a horn hit directly from the original King Records 45 of "Papa's Got a Brand New Bag" on "Swastikas on Parade". This sample predates hip-hop's adaptations of Brown riffs, beats, and soundbites by about 15 years.

The practice of cover songs went on to be a staple of the Residents' musical oeuvre. Later notable cover projects include the 1977 single The Beatles play the Residents and the Residents play the Beatles; the 1980s American Composers series (spawning two albums: George & James and Stars & Hank Forever) and The King & Eye, a 1989 album of Elvis Presley covers.

The Residents would perform the Swingin' Medallions' "Double Shot" in its entirety in 1988 for a single to promote their album God in Three Persons, in which the song's main riff is a recurring motif. The song would also be referenced on the 1989 Cube E show.

Track listing

2018 pREServed edition 

After a couple seconds of silence following track 9, an unlisted track plays. It is a radio ad for the Rather Ripped Records fifth birthday party on June 7, 1976, at which the Residents performed; their entire set from that event is presented on disc 2 as track 1.

Personnel
 The Residents – vocals, drums, soprano sax, alto sax, cornet, French horn, clarinet, trombone, synthesizers, pipe organ, xylophone, piped snooter, electric violin, piano, organ, guitars, oud, bass, percussion, stretch globel, koto, accordion, hanging lamb, rubboard
 Peggy Honeydew - vocals
Pamela Zeibak – vocals
Snakefinger – guitar on "Satisfaction"
Gary Phillips (credited as "the former bass player from the Front Line") - guitar

References and footnotes

The Residents albums
1976 albums
Nazism in fiction
Concept albums
Covers albums
Cultural depictions of Adolf Hitler
Cultural depictions of James Brown
Cultural depictions of the Beatles
Cultural depictions of the Rolling Stones
Obscenity controversies in music
Ralph Records albums